Wild Innocence is a 2001 French film directed by Philippe Garrel.

Plot 

A young filmmaker wants to make a film about the social problem of heroin consumption.  However, the film's producers are themselves heroin dealers.

Cast 
 Mehdi Belhaj Kacem - François Mauge
 Julia Faure - Lucie
 Michel Subor - Chas
  - Alex
 Valérie Kéruzoré - Flora
  - Hutten
 Francine Bergé - Marie-Thérèse's mother
 Maurice Garrel - François's father
 Esther Garrel - Little girl

References

External links 

2001 comedy films
2001 films
Films directed by Philippe Garrel
French comedy films
2000s French films
2000s French-language films